= Salons Degermann =

Les Salons Degermann
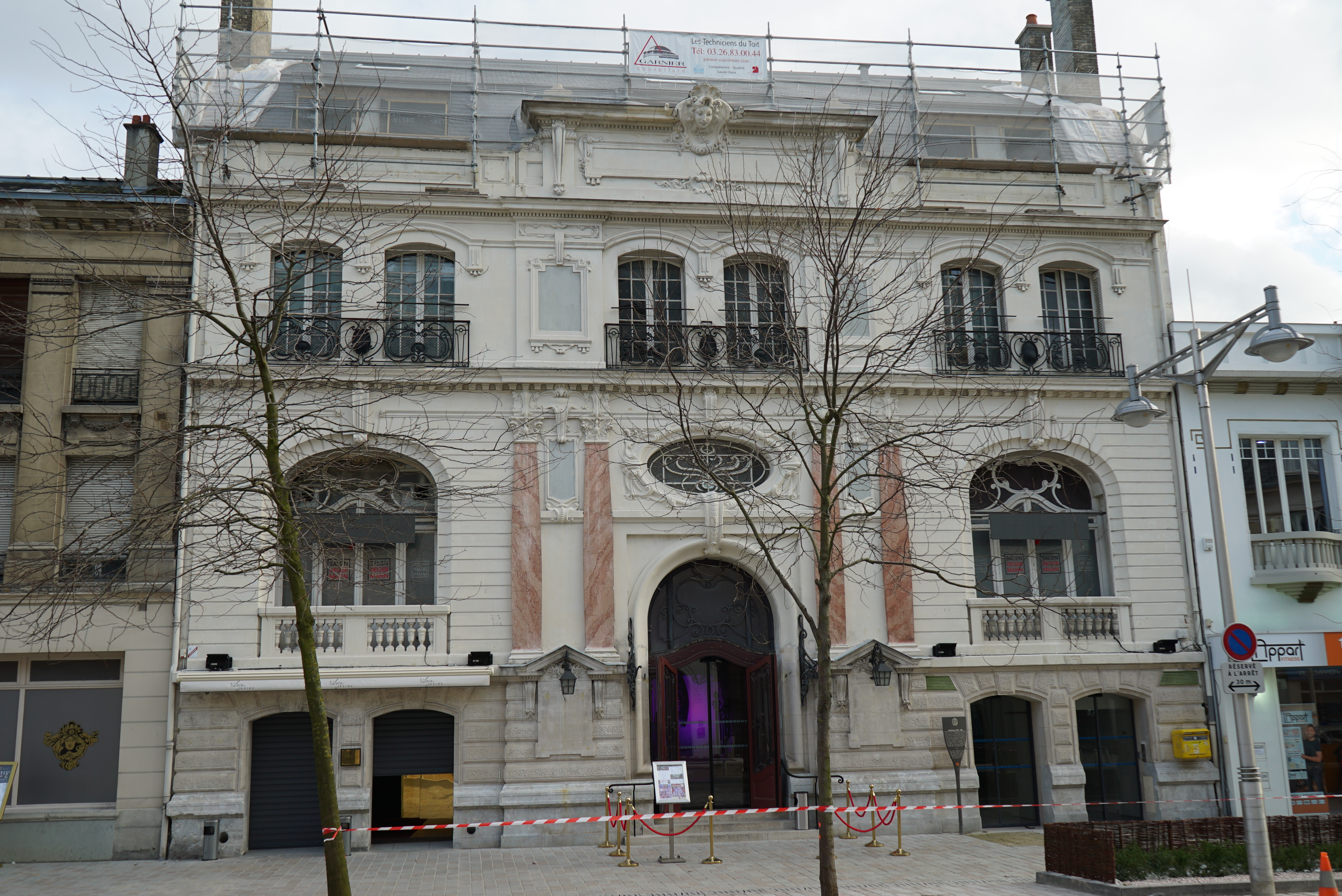
- The façade

- Location within France

General information
- Type: Event hall
- Architectural style: Art Deco
- Location: Rue Buirette, Reims, France
- Coordinates: 49.2557217°N 4.0285684°E
- Groundbreaking: 1922
- Completed: 1923
- Inaugurated: March 26, 1923
- Owner: M. Cahen

Design and construction
- Architect: Charles Boesch

Les Salons Degermann is an Art Deco building located on Rue Buirette in Reims, France. Originally constructed starting in 1922, the building was inaugurated on March 26, 1923. The building is named after Eugène Degermann, a caterer who commissioned its construction. It currently serves as a bar and reception hall.

== Architecture and decoration ==
Les Salons Degermann was designed by architect Charles Boesch. The interior sculptures were created by Charles Wary. The building was erected on the site of the former Salon Besnard, which was established by Olympe Besnard, who came to Reims in 1825 to participate in the decoration of the cathedral for the coronation of Charles X. The original building, constructed in 1837, served as a hall until it was purchased and demolished by Eugène Degermann.

The building suffered significant damage during World War I but was reopened on May 14, 1922. It remained in the Degermann family until 1970, after which it underwent renovations to restore its original gray and pink hues. Another renovation occurred in 2015.

== Gallery ==
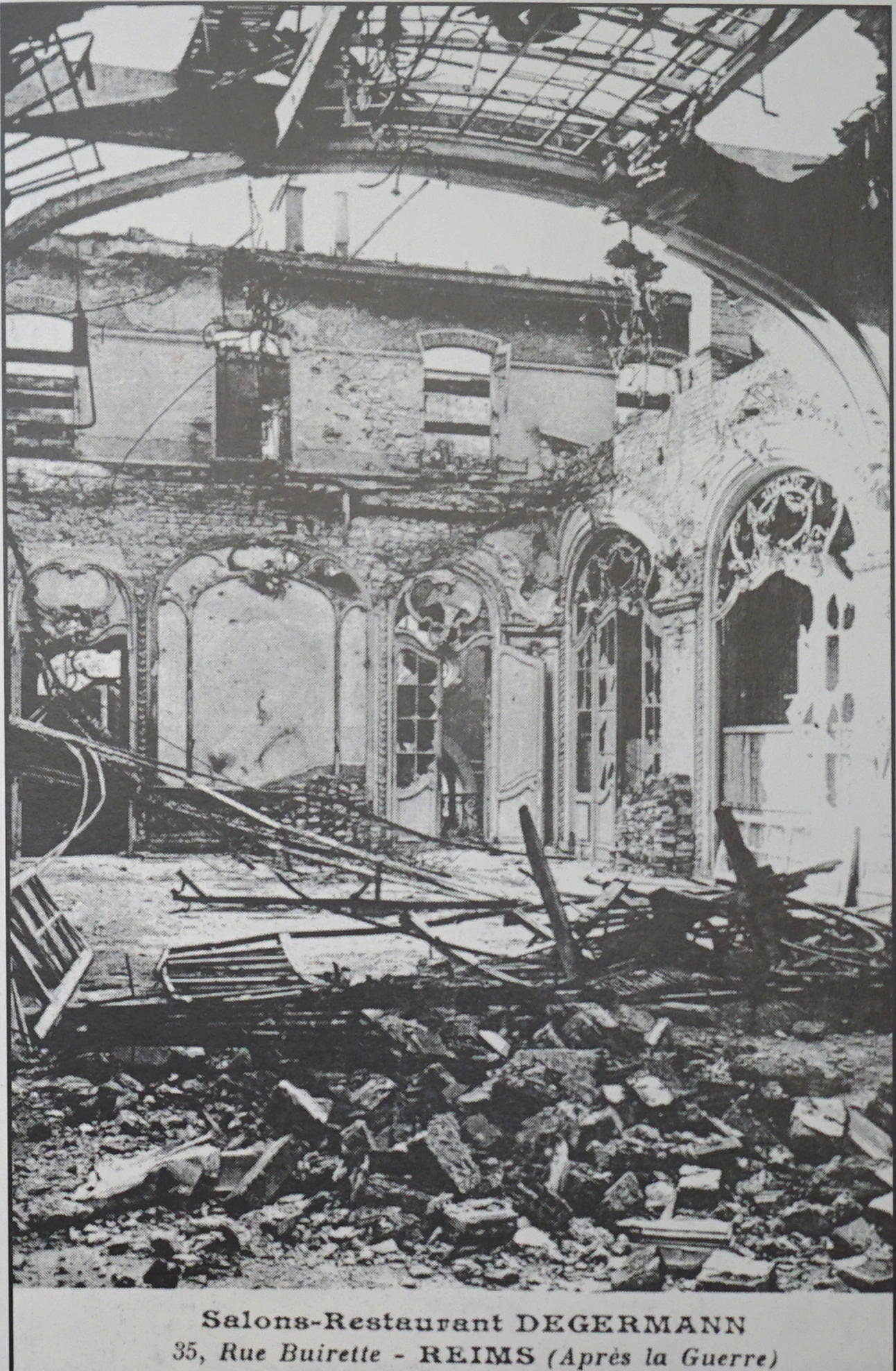
Damage from World War I

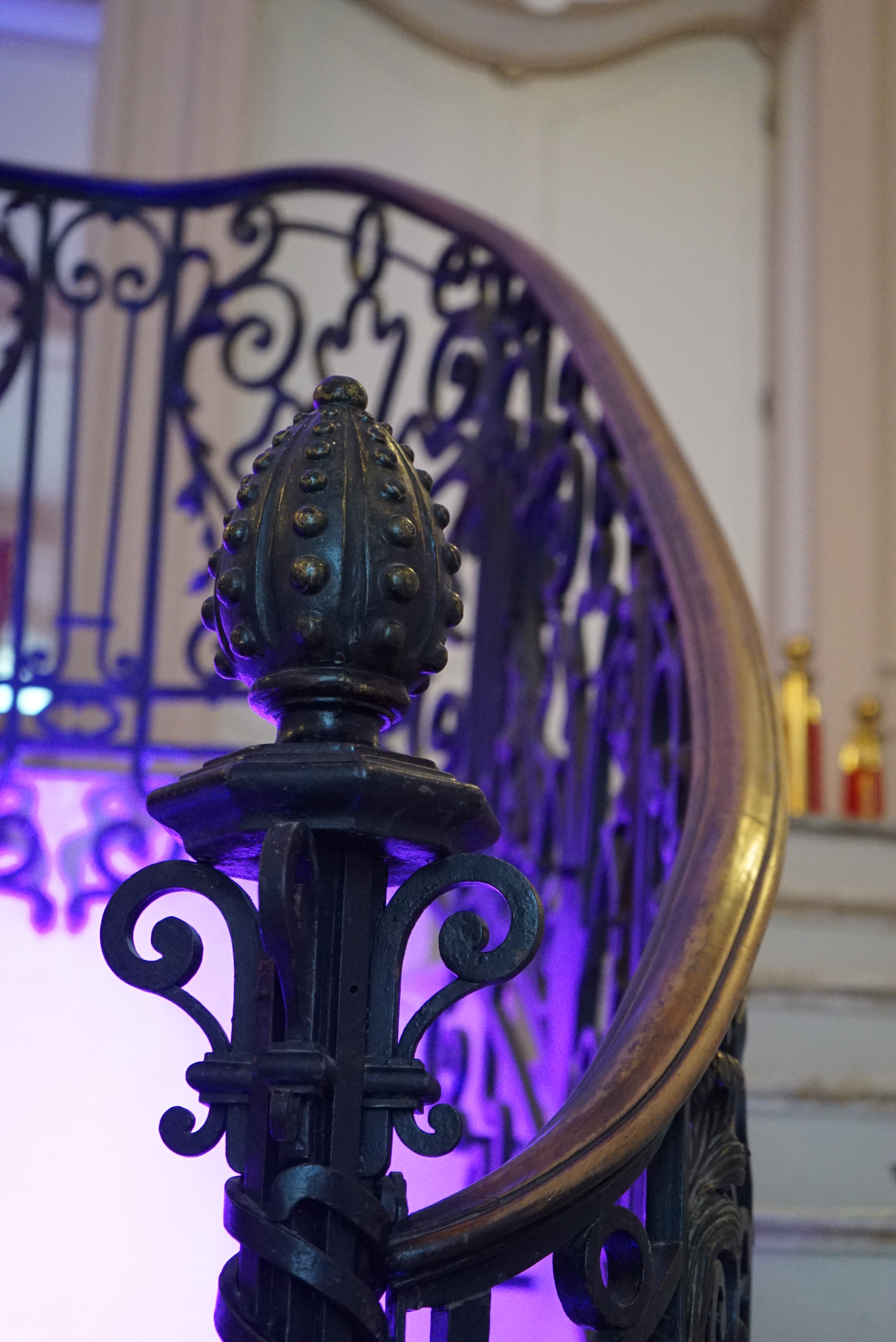
Pine cone ironwork on the staircase

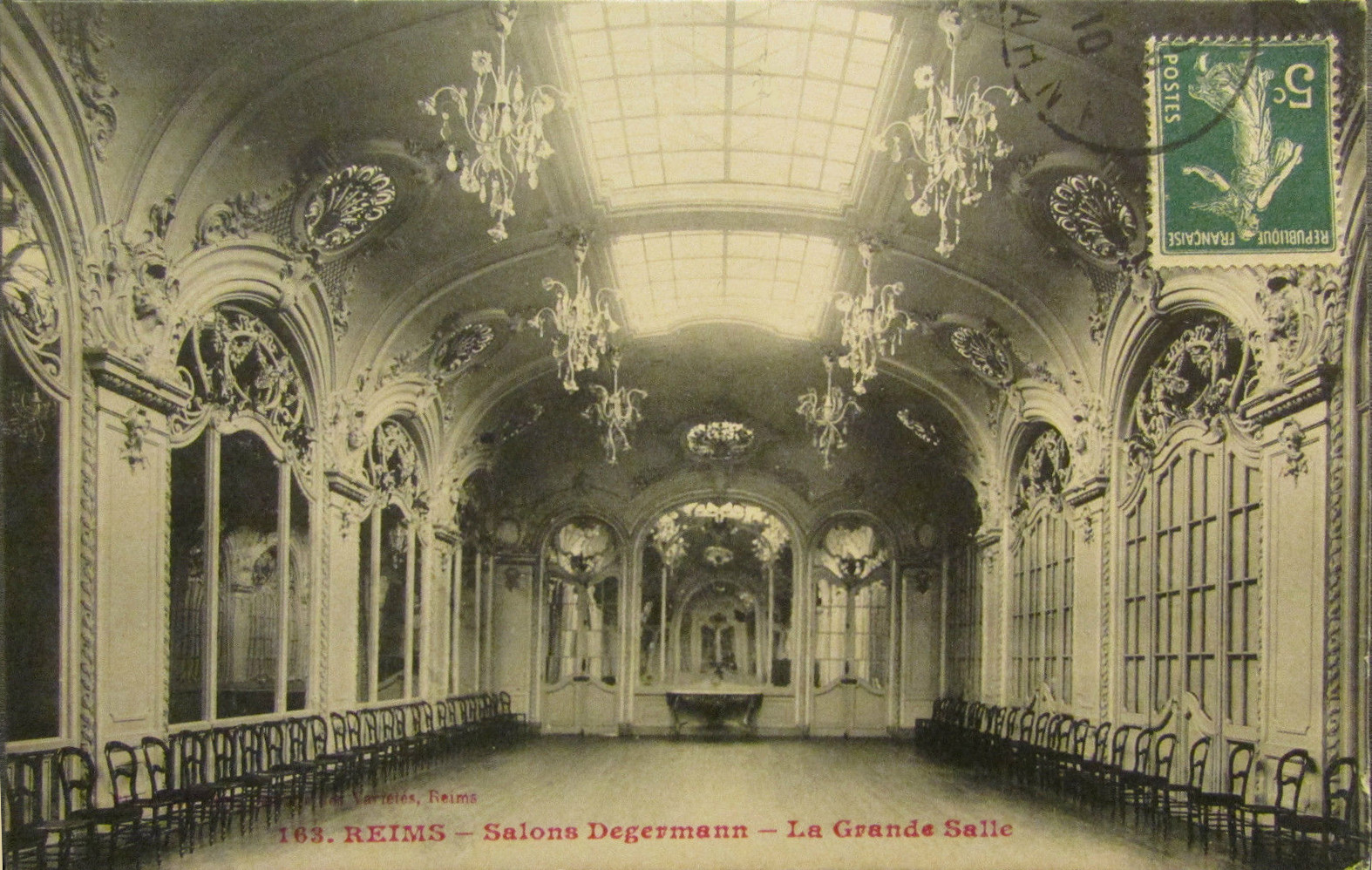
The hall in the early 20th century

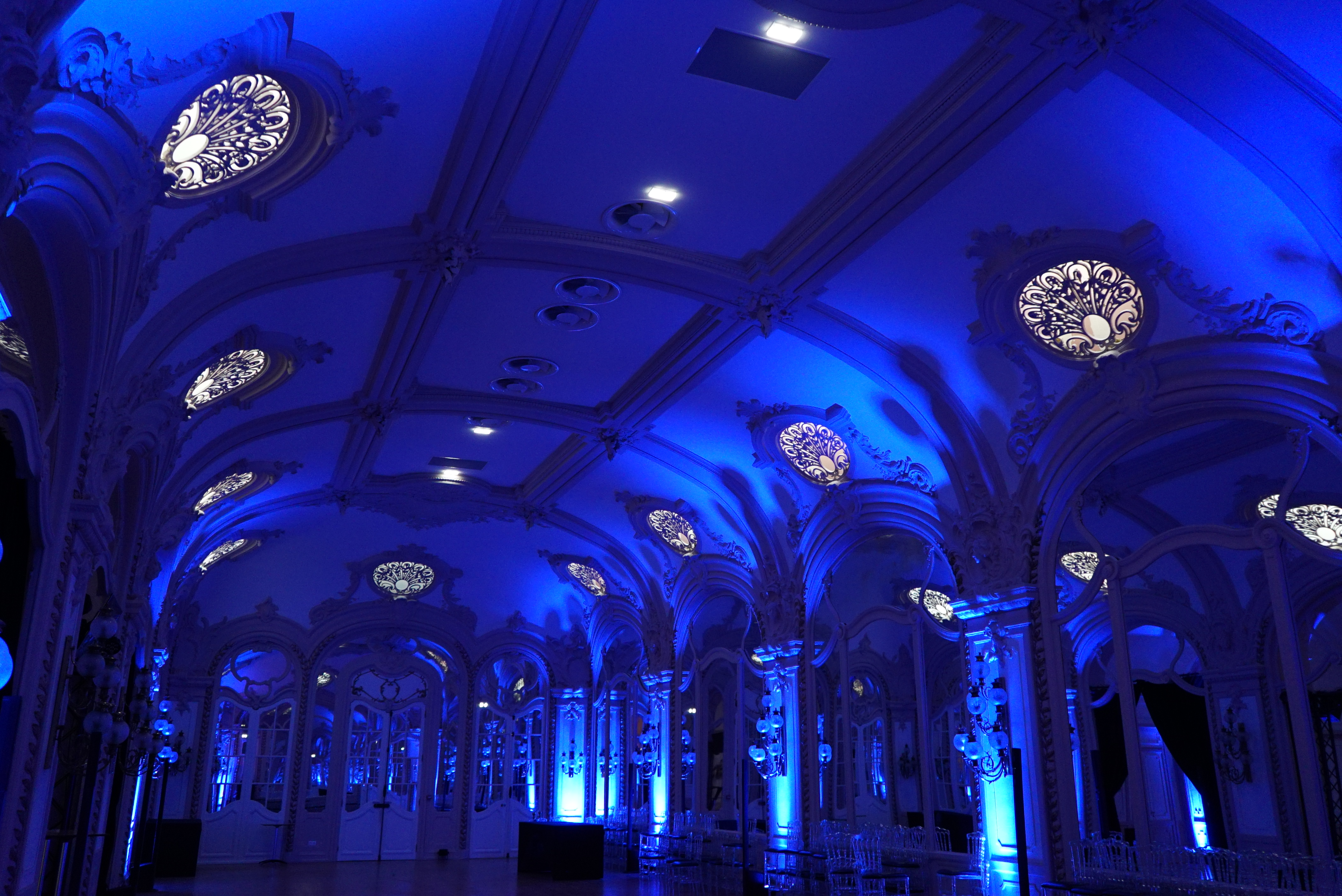
Current ambiance

== Bibliography ==
- Micheline Durin, Les salons Degermann historique d'un établissement centenaire, in Le Cafouin, Reims, autumn 2001, ISSN 0754-6262.
- Olivier Rigaud, Les salons Degermann in Amicarte 51 No. 24, 2nd trimester 1995, p. 35.
